Villenave d’Ornon (Gascon: Vilanava d’Ornon) is a commune in the Gironde department in Nouvelle-Aquitaine in southwestern France.

It is the fourth-largest suburb of the city of Bordeaux, and is located to its south side. Thus, it is a member of the Bordeaux Métropole. Villenave-d'Ornon station has rail connections to Langon and Bordeaux.

Population

Twin towns – sister cities

Villenave-d'Ornon is twinned with:
 Seeheim-Jugenheim, Germany (1982)
 Torres Vedras, Portugal (1992)
 Bridgend, Wales, United Kingdom (1994)

See also
Communes of the Gironde department

References

External links

 Official website 

Communes of Gironde